Phragmataecia innominata is a species of moth of the family Cossidae. It is found in South Africa, Mozambique and Malawi.

References

Moths described in 1923
Phragmataecia
Moths of Sub-Saharan Africa
Lepidoptera of Mozambique
Lepidoptera of Malawi
Lepidoptera of South Africa